The Guernsey is a breed of dairy cattle from the island of Guernsey in the Channel Islands. It is fawn or red and white in colour, and is hardy and docile. Its milk is rich in flavour, high in fat and protein, and has a golden-yellow tinge due to its high β-carotene content. The Guernsey is one of three Channel Island cattle breeds, the others being the Alderney – now extinct – and the Jersey.

History 

The Guernsey was bred on the Channel Island of Guernsey; it is first documented in the nineteenth century, and its origins are unknown. Cattle were brought to the island in the Middle Ages for draught work. It has been suggested that the Guernsey derives from cattle imported from the French mainland – brindled cattle from Normandy, and wheaten stock similar to the Froment du Léon of Brittany. There may also have been some influence from Dutch cattle in the eighteenth century. During that century large numbers of cattle were exported from the Channel Islands to England; some of them had previously been brought from France. Imports of French cattle to Guernsey were forbidden by law in 1819, but some importation of British cattle continued until 1877. Some cattle evacuated from Alderney during the Second World War were merged into the breed.

Exports of cattle and semen were for a while an important economic resource for the island, and in the early 20th century, a large number of Guernsey cattle were exported to the United States. The Guernsey breed is on the watch list maintained by the American Livestock Breeds Conservancy, with fewer than 2,500 annual registrations in the U.S. and an estimated global population less than 10,000 animals.

Characteristics 

The Guernsey is of medium size: cows weigh , and bulls . The coat is red or fawn (wheat-coloured), and may or may not be pied red-and-white or fawn-and-white. The Guernsey produces rich and flavoursome milk. It traditionally had several other good qualities: it was long-lived, calved without difficulty, grazed well and – being relatively small-sized –  was an efficient milk producer. These advantages have been compromised by recent selective breeding strategies, which have led to larger animals, with longer legs. These no longer display the traditional qualities of the breed; this is particularly marked where there has been cross-breeding with Holstein-Friesian stock.

Use 

The Guernsey is a dairy breed, and generally is reared for that purpose only. However, the cow is usually removed from the dairy herd around ages six to eight, and marketed for beef, and other processed meats. The milk has a golden-yellow tinge due to a high content of β-carotene, a provitamin for vitamin A. The milk also has a high butterfat content of 5% and a high protein content of 3.7%. Guernsey cows produce around 6000 litres per cow per year.

References

External links 

 The American Guernsey Association
 English Guernsey Cattle Society
 The World Guernsey Cattle Federation
 Guernsey Cow Parade

Dairy cattle breeds
Guernsey
Conservation Priority Breeds of the Livestock Conservancy
Cattle breeds
Cattle breeds originating in the Channel Islands